Neocrepidodera brevicollis is a species of flea beetle from a leaf beetle family that can be found in Austria, Czech Republic, Denmark, France, Germany, Italy, Poland, Slovakia, Sweden, and Switzerland.

References

Beetles described in 1904
Beetles of Europe
brevicollis
Endemic fauna of Italy